Tim Jamison, II (born February 26, 1986) is a former American football defensive end. He played college football at the University of Michigan.

Early years
In his high school career, Jamison recorded 217 tackles (89 solo, 71 for losses), 45 sacks, and 14 forced fumbles.  In his senior year, he recorded 89 tackles (31 for losses), 21 sacks, 14 quarterback hurries, three forced fumbles, recovered four fumbles, and defended 12 passes. Jamison was selected to play in the 2004 U.S. Army All-American Bowl in San Antonio, Texas.

College career

2004
He enrolled in the University of Michigan and in his first season with the team he recorded four tackles before enduring a season-ending injury.

2005
Jamison made 10 tackles (4 for losses) in 10 games played, and 3 sacks.  His first career sack was against Eastern Michigan University.  At the end of the season, he was named to The Sporting News Freshman ALL-Big Ten team.  He recorded a sack in the 2005 Alamo Bowl against the Nebraska Cornhuskers when he sacked Zac Taylor in which Michigan lost 28-32.

2006
He started the season in the depth chart as a backup defensive end to Rondell Biggs. He missed the season opener against Vanderbilt.  He returned to see action against the Central Michigan Chippewas when he played as a backup. He recorded his first sack of the season when he sacked future Cleveland Browns quarterback Brady Quinn in the annual game against Notre Dame. He finished the season with 13 tackles and 5 sacks, including 3 tackles in the 2007 Rose Bowl.

2007
He started all 13 games at defensive end and was credited with 52 tackles (10 for losses), 5.5 sacks, 1 interception, 3 passes defended and two forced fumbles.

2008
As a fifth-year senior, he served as co-captain.

Professional career

Pre-draft
Jamison ran a 5.09 40 yard dash and did  21 reps on the bench press at the NFL Combine.

Houston Texans
Jamison was signed as an undrafted free agent by the Texans.

External links
Michigan Wolverines Bio
Jamison handy with diapers
 http://www.michigandaily.com/content/field-sophomore-end-jamison-shows-intensity 
 http://www.michigandaily.com/content/field-sophomore-end-jamison-shows-intensity

1986 births
Living people
Sportspeople from Cook County, Illinois
American football defensive ends
Michigan Wolverines football players
Houston Texans players